Madan Jain is an Indian actor in Hindi language films.

Career 
His major works include Saaransh and Ankush.

Filmography

Films

 1980 Albert Pinto Ko Gussa Kyon Ata Hai
 1980 The Naxalites – Comrade Babu
 1981 Pehla Adhyay
 1981 Sazaye Maut
 1981 Chakra
 1981 Kalyug – Kulkarni
 1982 Vijeta – Flight Lieutenant Venkat, Angad's friend
 1983 Ardh Satya
 1983 Godam – Inspector Patil
 1984 Party   – Subhash
 1984 Mashaal - Somu (Somesh)
 1984 Saaransh – Vilas Chitre
 1985 Janam - Vilas Desai
 1985 Ek Bhool (TV Movie)
 1985 Bhulaye Na Bane
 1985 Scandal (Video)
 1986 Ankush – Shashi
 1986 Nasamajh
 1987 Thikana - Cameraman Avinash
 1987 Kaal Chakra-Shankar Pradhan
 1988 Inteqam – Police Inspector 
 1989 Wasta
 1990 Pratibandh
 1990 Vanchit
 1991 Milan Ki Aag
 1992 Benaam Rishte
 1995 Andolan  as Police Inspector Subhash
 1995 God and Gun
 1995 Gundaraj as Police Inspector Vijay Sharma
 1995 Ek Ka Jawab Do
 1996 Vijeta – Advocate (uncredited)
 1997 Anyay Hi Anyay
 1998 Zakhm – Anwar Hashmi
 1999 Sangharsh – Police Officer
 2001 Yeh Raaste Hain Pyaar Ke – Madhuri's brother in law
 2002 Kranti- Traitor Police Inspector Pawar
 2002 Kuch Tum Kaho Kuch Hum Kahein- Jaikumar Solanki
 2005 Page 3 – ACP Uday Yadav
 2008 Gumnaam: The Mystery – Rishi Gandhi (as Madan)
 2013 Haani – Teacher
 2014 Heartless

Television

 1992 Khali Haat (TV Serial)
 1996 Amar Prem
 1995-2001 Aahat
 1998-2018 C.I.D
 2011 Taarak Mehta Ka Ooltah Chashmah

References

External links
 

Indian male film actors
Male actors in Hindi cinema
Male actors in Marathi cinema
20th-century Indian male actors
21st-century Indian male actors
Male actors in Hindi television